Route 125 runs between U.S. Route 65 at Fair Grove and the Arkansas state line, where it continues as Highway 125.  After the road crosses into Marion County, Arkansas, the highway crosses Bull Shoals Lake via a free ferry.  It is a two-lane road its entire length.  Near Chadwick, the highway enters the Mark Twain National Forest and passes through this most of the way to Arkansas. It also overlaps U.S. Route 160 for several miles at Rueter.  It overlaps Route 14 through most of Sparta. It crosses US 60 near Rogersville. It cross I-44 near Strafford, Missouri. The roads ends at U.S. Route 65 at Fair Grove and the road continues as Missouri Route CC.

From its northern terminus at Fair Grove the highway passes through eastern Greene County, northern and southeastern Christian County and eastern Taney County.

Major intersections

References

125
Transportation in Taney County, Missouri
Transportation in Christian County, Missouri
Transportation in Greene County, Missouri